Gaston Bart-Williams (1938-1990) was a Sierra Leonean journalist, film director, novelist, poet, diplomat and activist. He lived and worked mainly in Germany.

Life
Gaston Bart-Williams was born in Freetown on 3 March 1938 to Sierra Leone Creole parents. He was educated at the Prince of Wales School in Freetown and then Bo School in Bo. He founded the African Youth Cultural Society in 1958, and was Sierra Leone's delegate at the 1959 World Assembly of Youth in Bamako, Mali.

From 1961 to 1963 Bart-Williams studied theatre direction in the UK under Clifford Williams. He won the London Writers' Poetry Award in 1962, and the Michael Karolji International Award in 1963. In 1964 he won a cultural grant from the German London Embassy. He settled in Cologne, where he worked as a freelance writer and film director.

Works

Plays
 A Bouquet of Carnations
 In Praise of Madness
 Uhuru

Films
 Zur Nacht, 1967
 Immer nur Mordgeschichten, 1968

References

External links
 

1938 births
1990 deaths
Sierra Leone Creole people
Sierra Leonean journalists
Sierra Leonean film directors
Sierra Leonean activists
20th-century journalists